The International Journal of Food and Allied Sciences is a peer-reviewed Food Science and Nutrition journal covering the fields of Food Science and Technology, Food Safety and Microbiology, Pharma Nutrition, Biochemistry and Agricultural Sciences with a focus on food crops. It is the official journal of the Institute of Food Science and Nutrition, Bahauddin Zakariya University Multan Pakistan.

About 
The journal only publishes novel, high quality and high impact review papers, original research papers and short communications, in the various disciplines encompassing the science, technology of food and its allied sciences. It has been developed to create a truly international forum for the communication of research in food and allied sciences.

Aim and Scope 
The journal solicits papers on topics including functional foods, food allergies and intolerances, diet and disease, malnutrition, public Health and dietary patterns.

References

External links 
 
 Institute of Food Science and Nutrition

Publications established in 2015
Food science journals
English-language journals
Biannual journals